Galo da Madrugada (in Portuguese: Dawn's Rooster) is a carnival block from Recife, Brazil. The block was created in 1978 by Enéias Freire. 
Galos parades every Saturday of carnival at  neighborhood.
The main rhythm is the frevo, but other rhythms are also played.

It is named in The Guinness Book of World Records as the biggest carnival parade in the world, considering the number of participants. In 2013, that number was more than 2,500,000 people.
Its size is only matched by Cordão da Bola Preta in Rio de Janeiro.

Hino do Galo - Hymn of Galo 

Ei pessoal, vem moçada
Carnaval começa no Galo da Madrugada
Ei pessoal, vem moçada
Carnaval começa no Galo da Madrugada

A manhã já vem surgindo
O sol clareia a cidade com seus raios de cristal
E o Galo da Madrugada
Já está na rua, saudando o Carnaval

Ei pessoal...

As donzelas estão dormindo
As flores recebendo o orvalho matinal
E o Galo da Madrugada
Já está na rua, saudando o Carnaval

Ei pessoal...

O Galo também é de briga
As esporas afiadas, e a crista é coral
E o Galo da Madrugada
Já está na rua, saudando o Carnaval

References

Recife
Brazilian Carnival
Parades in Brazil
Festivals established in 1978